Christopher Neame (born 12 September 1947, London) is an English actor now living in the United States.

UK career
Neame's UK film credits include appearances in two Hammer Horror films: Lust for a Vampire (1971) and Dracula AD 1972 (1972), as well as No Blade of Grass (1970).

He is known to television viewers in the United Kingdom and abroad for a number of roles. He appeared in “The Rivals of Sherlock Holmes” as Sydney Wing in the episode entitled "The Secret of the Magnifique." In 1975 he played Kaiser Wilhelm II in the ITV 13-part drama series, Edward the Seventh.
He also featured in two BBC dramas dealing with the Second World War - Lieutenant Dick Player in Colditz (1972–74). Neame played Flight Lieutenant John Curtis in the first season of the World War II drama, Secret Army (1977). In between those in the TV film A Point in Time (1973), he became one of the first male actors to appear nude on the small screen.

Neame played the villain Skagra in the unfinished Doctor Who serial Shada in 1979. He provided his voice to complete the serial using animation in 2017. Neame made a guest appearance in another BBC period drama When the Boat Comes In in 1981 portraying Robin Cunningham. In 1983, he played Mark Antony in the BBC series The Cleopatras. 

In addition, Neame produced some episodes of the 1990s drama series Soldier Soldier.

USA career

Neame emigrated to the United States since when he has made frequent appearances in American films and television. He appeared in the films,  Steel Dawn (1987), D.O.A. (1988), Bloodstone (1988), the James Bond film Licence to Kill (1989),  Ghostbusters II (1989), Edge of Honor (1991), Suburban Commando (1991), Hellbound (1994), Ground Zero (2000) and The Prestige (2006).

He played a psycho killer in an episode of MacGyver in 1985, and appeared in The Great Escape II: The Untold Story. In 1989, he played the character Gustav Hellstrom, a Swedish businessman, in the 12th season of the successful TV series "Dallas", appearing in 3 episodes: "Serpent's Tooth", "April Showers", "And Away We Go". He also appeared in a two-part story of Star Trek: Enterprise in 2004. In 1994, he portrayed "Knight Two" in the Babylon 5 episode "And the Sky Full of Stars". Neame is one of the few actors to have appeared in Doctor Who, Blake's 7, Star Trek, Babylon 5, and Earth 2.  Other television appearances include Dynasty, The A-Team, Benson, Beauty and the Beast, Northern Exposure (1994), JAG (1995), and the two-part mini-series The Apocalypse Watch (1996). He also starred in the Showtime film Street Knight (1994) and he appeared as "The One" in the last two episodes of Martial Law (2000).  He also played the main villain in the live-action cutscenes of Star Wars Jedi Knight: Dark Forces II (1997). In 2018, he reunited with his Hammer film co-star Caroline Munro to appear in the film House of the Gorgon.

Filmography
No Blade of Grass (1970) - Locke
Lust for a Vampire (1971) - Hans
Dracula AD 1972 (1972) - Johnny Alucard
Benson (1985) season 7 episode 5 "We Spy" as Max Heimlich
Steel Dawn (1987) - Sho
D.O.A. (1988) - Bernard
Transformations (1988) - Calihan
Bloodstone (1988) - Van Hoeven
The Great Escape II: The Untold Story (1988) - Kiowski
Dynasty (1988-1989) - Hamilton Stone
Licence to Kill (1989) - Fallon
Ghostbusters II (1989) - Maitre D'
 The Flash (1990 TV series)- Brian Gideon
The Radicals (1990) - Ulrich Zwingli
Edge of Honor (1991) - Blade
Suburban Commando (1991) - Commander
Diplomatic Immunity (1991) - Stefan Noll
Still Not Quite Human (1992) - Dr. Frederick Berrigon
Boris and Natasha (1992) - Fearless Leader
Irresistible Force (1993) - James Barron
Street Knight (1993) - James Franklin
Hellbound (1994) - Professor Malcolm Lockley \ Prosatanos
Star Wars: Jedi Knight - Dark Forces II (1997) - Jerec
Walking Thunder (1997) - Ansel Richter
Ground Zero (2000) - Andrew Donovan
Highway 395 (2000) - Klauss Hess
Special Ed (2005) - Dr. Davis
The Prestige (2006) - Defender
House of the Gorgon (2019) - Father Llewellyn

References

External links
 

1947 births
Living people
English male television actors
English male film actors
British expatriates in the United States
Male actors from London
20th-century English male actors
21st-century English male actors